The Daylight Limited was an express passenger train between Auckland and Wellington, New Zealand along the North Island Main Trunk.  It commenced in 1925 and was replaced by the Scenic Daylight in 1963.

Introduction 

After the introduction of the Night Limited in 1924, the New Zealand Railways Department investigated the possibility of a daylight train between Wellington and Auckland.  It was introduced on a trial basis in 1925-26, but was then cancelled until another trial in 1929-30.  The economic impact of the Great Depression intervened and the service was cut back to operating solely during the Christmas and Easter peak seasons.

Operation 

In the off-peak season the Night Limited catered for passenger demand between Auckland and Wellington, but at the times of the most intense demand extra trains ran.  In the early years of the service, AB and sometimes WAB class steam locomotives operated the train, and later more modern locomotives such as the KA class were used, with ED and EW electric locomotives between Wellington and Paekakariki from 1940.

The train made extended stops at Mercer, Frankton, Taumarunui and Marton for refreshments: Marton refreshment rooms closed in 1954 and Mercer in 1958.

Replacement 

In 1963, the train was replaced by the diesel-hauled Scenic Daylight operating year-round.

References
New Zealand History Online - The Daylight Limited: Poster and Article

External links
Photo of Limited Express at Frankton Station c1937 
 

Long-distance passenger trains in New Zealand
Railway services introduced in 1925
Railway services discontinued in 1963
1925 establishments in New Zealand
1963 disestablishments in New Zealand
Discontinued railway services in New Zealand